The Toyoda Gosei Scorpions is a professional basketball team that competes in the third division of the Japanese B.League.

Coaches
Masao Kuda

Roster

Notable players
Luke Evans (fr)
Masao Kuda
Ladislav Pecka
Earnest Ross
Joe Wolfinger

Arenas

TOYODA GOSEI Memorial Gymnasium
Toyoda Gosei Health Care Center
Park Arena Komaki
Jimokuji General Gymnasium
Kasugai City General Gymnasium
Ichinomiya City General Gymnasium
Togo Town General Gymnasium
Energy Support Arena
Kitanagoya City Health Dome
Oharu Town Sports Center

References

 
Basketball teams in Japan
Sports teams in Aichi Prefecture
Basketball teams established in 1980
1980 establishments in Japan